Yeghnajur is a village in the Amasia Municipality of the Shirak Province of Armenia. Its population was 28 at the 2001 census.

Demographics

References 

Populated places in Shirak Province